Al Wasta Sporting Club, sometimes referred to as Al Wasty, is an Egyptian football club based in Beni Suef, Egypt. The club is currently playing in the Egyptian Second Division, the second-highest league in the Egyptian football league system.

Egyptian Second Division
Football clubs in Egypt